Pierre Collet (10 March 1914 – 30 October 1977) was a French film actor. He appeared in more than 100 films and television shows between 1943 and 1977.

Selected filmography

 Goodbye Leonard (1943) - Le marchand d'habits (uncredited)
 Night Shift (1944) - Un réparateur de ligne (uncredited)
 Coup de tête (1944) - (uncredited)
 Florence est folle (1944)
 Night Warning (1946)
 La Maison sous la mer (1947) - Un mineur (uncredited)
 Histoires extraordinaires (1949) - Cotin / François
 The Winner's Circle (1950) - (uncredited)
 Royal Affairs in Versailles (1954) - Petit rôle (uncredited)
 If Paris Were Told to Us (1956) - Petit rôle (uncredited)
 Méfiez-vous fillettes (1957) - (uncredited)
 Thérèse Étienne (1958) - L'avocat
 Échec au porteur (1958) - Morigny
 Le désordre et la nuit (1958) - Un inspecteur (uncredited)
 Le vent se lève (1959) - Crewman
 Le fauve est lâché (1959) - Marcel, le garagiste (uncredited)
 Des femmes disparaissent (1959) - Nasol
 La Valse du Gorille (1959) - Bergère
 125, rue Montmartre (1959)
 Way of Youth (1959) - Un gendarme (uncredited)
 Quai du Point-du-Jour (1960)
 Recours en grâce (1960) - Le gendarme Fromont
 The Old Guard (1960) - Le livreur de bières
 Terrain vague (1960)
 Les Honneurs de la guerre (1961) - Morizot
 Le cave se rebiffe (1961) - Le chauffeur de taxi (uncredited)
 Les Ennemis (1962) - René - un homme de Gerlier
 Le Gentleman d'Epsom (1962) - Un parieur à jumelles (uncredited)
 La parole est au témoin (1963)
 Jeff Gordon, Secret Agent (1963) - Un gendarme (uncredited)
 Du mouron pour les petits oiseaux (1963) - Un consommateur au café (uncredited)
 Any Number Can Win (1963) - Camille (uncredited)
 Le temps des copains (1963)
 Si tous les amoureux du monde... (1963)
 Diary of a Chambermaid (1964) - Le voyageur
 Greed in the Sun (1964) - One of Castagliano's Employees
 Requiem pour un caïd (1964)
 The Unvanquished (1964) - Le policier au barrage (uncredited)
 Fantômas (1964) - Un agent
 Weekend at Dunkirk (1964) - Le capitaine Français
 The Gorillas (1964) - Le premier gardien à la Santé (uncredited)
 Le ciel sur la tête (1965)
 The Vampire of Düsseldorf (1965) - Le contremaître (uncredited)
 Circus Angel (1965) - Un truand
 Wake Up and Die (1966) - Le tenancier de l'hôtel (uncredited)
 Mademoiselle (1966) - Marcel
 Is Paris Burning? (1966) - Un policier résistant
 Triple Cross (1966) - German Warder
 Le Grand Dadais (1967) - Le commissaire
 Mr. and Mrs. Kabal's Theatre (1967) - M. Kabal (voice)
 The Return of Monte Cristo (1968) - L'ami d'Edmond à l'aeroclub
 Cemetery Without Crosses (1969) - Sheriff Ben
 Goto, Island of Love (1969)
 Life Love Death (1969) - Le bourreau
 Les patates (1969) - Le paysan à la carriole
 Rider on the Rain (1970) - (uncredited)
 Vertige pour un tueur (1970) - Le routier
 Le Cercle rouge (1970) - Le Gardien de prison
 Le Voyou (1970) - (uncredited)
 The Lion's Share (1971) - L'agriculteur
 La cavale (1971)
 The Widow Couderc (1971) - Le commissaire Mallet
 La Scoumoune (1972) - Le directeur de la prison
 Tintin and the Lake of Sharks (1972) - Le commentateur TV (voice)
 Le gang des otages (1973)
 Le Silencieux (1973) - Le garagiste
 Un officier de police sans importance (1973)
 The Invitation (1973) - Pierre
 Hit! (1973) - Zero
 L'emmerdeur (1973) - Le boucher
 Two Men in Town (1973) - Le commissaire
 The Train (1973) - Le maire de Funnoy
 Les grands sentiments font les bons gueuletons (1973) - Le propriétaire de la Deux Chevaux
 Nuits rouges (1974) - Le Grand Maître des Templiers
 Bons baisers... à lundi (1974) - Le veilleur de nuit
 The Common Man (1975) - Un ivrogne
 French Connection II (1975) - Old Pro
 Opération Lady Marlène (1975) - Le concierge de Kramer
 Oublie-moi, Mandoline (1976)
 Le jour de noces (1977) - Felix

External links

1914 births
1977 deaths
French male film actors
People from Montrouge
20th-century French male actors